M'Bour or Mbour (Wolof: Mbuur), is a city in the Thiès Region of Senegal. It lies on the Petite Côte, approximately eighty kilometers south of Dakar. It is home to a population of nearly 233,000 (2013 census).  

The city's major industries are tourism, fishing and peanut processing. M'Bour is a tourist destination. It is situated on the "Little Coast" and connected to Dakar via the N1 road. 

It is noteworthy for the orphanage and nursery for children run by the international NGO Vivre Ensemble, and for the African Institute for Mathematical Sciences, Senegal.

140 migrants drowned on October 29, 2020 when a boat from M'Bour that was bound for the Canary Islands capsized near Saint-Louis, Senegal.

Notable residents or natives
 Viviane N'Dour, Singer
 Youssou Diagne, Politician
 Ibrahima Niane, Footballer

Gallery

See also
 Mbour Sign Language

References

Populated places in Thiès Region
Communes of Senegal
Petite Côte